Prasert Innui (Thai ประเสริฐ อินนุ้ย  ), is a Thai former futsal striker.

He competed for Thailand at the 2004 and 2008 FIFA Futsal World Cup finals.

References

Prasert Innui
1978 births
Living people
Prasert Innui
Futsal forwards
Prasert Innui
Southeast Asian Games medalists in futsal
Competitors at the 2007 Southeast Asian Games